The 1944 National Football League Draft was held on April 19, 1944, at the Warwick Hotel in Philadelphia, Pennsylvania. With the first overall pick of the draft, the Boston Yanks selected quarterback Angelo Bertelli.

Player selections

Round one

Round two

Round three

Round four

Round five

Round six

Round seven

Round eight

Round nine

Round ten

Round eleven

Round twelve

Round thirteen

Round fourteen

Round fifteen

Round sixteen

Round seventeen

Round eighteen

Round nineteen

Round twenty

Round twenty-one

Round twenty-two

Round twenty-three

Round twenty-four

Round twenty-five

Round twenty-six

Round twenty-seven

Round twenty-eight

Round twenty-nine

Round thirty

Round thirty-one

Round thirty-two

Hall of Famers
 Otto Graham, quarterback from Northwestern taken 1st round 4th overall by the Detroit Lions.
Inducted: Professional Football Hall of Fame class of 1965.
 Steve Van Buren, halfback from LSU taken 1st round 5th overall by the Philadelphia Eagles.
Inducted: Professional Football Hall of Fame class of 1965.
 Bob Waterfield, quarterback from UCLA taken 5th round 42nd overall by the Cleveland Rams.
Inducted: Professional Football Hall of Fame class of 1965.
 Ed Sprinkle, guard/defensive end from Navy taken undrafted by the Chicago Bears. 
Inducted: Professional Football Hall of Fame class of 2020.

Notable undrafted players

References

External links
 NFL.com – 1944 Draft
 databaseFootball.com – 1944 Draft
 Pro Football Hall of Fame

National Football League Draft
Draft
NFL Draft
NFL Draft
1940s in Philadelphia
American football in Philadelphia
Events in Philadelphia